Piel may refer to:

People
 Claude Piel, (1921–1982), French aircraft designer
 Eleanor Jackson Piel )1920-2022), American lawyer
 Gerard Piel (1915–2004), American science journalist and publisher of the new Scientific American
 Jonathan Piel, (born 1938), American science journalist and editor
 Monika Piel, (born 1951), German radio and television journalist

Other uses
 Piel (TV series)
 Piel CP.500, a light aircraft designed by Claude Piel
 Piel Island, one of the Islands of Furness in northern England
 Piel Castle, a castle on Piel Island
 "Piel", a song by Arca from Arca

See also
 Pi'el a stem class in Biblical Hebrew and Modern Hebrew verb conjugation